Hollie Hughes (October 16, 1888 - January, 1981) was a trainer of Thoroughbred racehorses who won the 1916 Kentucky Derby and was a six-time winner of the most prestigious steeplechase race in the United States, the American Grand National. His career successes earned him induction into the U. S. Racing Hall of Fame in 1973. In 1979, a New York-bred race at Aqueduct Racetrack was named in his honor.

Early life and career
Hughes was born on a farm not far from Amsterdam, New York. At age 15 he took a job at Gen. Stephen Sanford's Hurricana Stud Farm in Amsterdam where, by 1914, the then 26 year-old was appointed head trainer for the Sanford racing operations. Although he would remain in that position for the next 61 years until retiring in 1975 at the age of 87, Hughes joined the United States Army during World War I.

In 1916 Hollie Hughes won the Kentucky Derby with George Smith. A winner of 20 stakes races, Hollie Hughes enjoyed his most success with steeplechase runners. In addition to his six American Grand National wins, horses under his care won all the major steeplechase events.

"Don't fall off"
The May 2, 1998 issue of the New York Times wrote that Ron Turcotte, Secretariat's jockey, had often told a story about meeting Hollie Hughes just before the 1973 Belmont Stakes. Hughes told him: "Son, you're riding the greatest horse that ever looked through a bridle. I have seen them all, including Man o' War. Secretariat is the best I've ever seen. You will win the Belmont. Don't fall off."

Personal life and death
Hollie Hughes was married to actress Grace Davison from 1926 until her death in 1964.

Hollie Hughes passed away in January 1981 at age 92. He is buried with his wife, Anne Mitchell Hughes, at Saint Mary's Cemetery in Fort Johnson, New York, about 3 miles from the Sanford Stud in Amsterdam.

References

1888 births
1981 deaths
United States Army personnel of World War I
American horse trainers
Steeplechase (horse racing)
People from Amsterdam, New York
United States Thoroughbred Racing Hall of Fame inductees